Aprelevka is a town in Naro-Fominsky District of Moscow Oblast, Russia, located along the Moscow–Kaluga railway,  from Moscow. Population:

Etymology
The town was named after the nearby Aprelevka River. While the name is quite similar to the Russian word "" (April), it bears no etymological connection to it. Rather, it is derived from the word "", meaning a "damp place" or a "bog".

History
Aprelevka was founded in 1899. It was granted urban-type settlement status in 1935 and the town status in 1961.

Administrative and municipal status
Within the framework of administrative divisions, it is, together with eight rural localities, incorporated within Naro-Fominsky District as the Town of Aprelevka. As a municipal division, the Town of Aprelevka is incorporated within Naro-Fominsky Municipal District as Aprelevka Urban Settlement.

Economy

Aprelevka's most notable industry was the Soviet Union's largest plant producing vinyl discs, which was founded in 1910 by three German businessmen: Gottlieb Moll, his son Johann, and August Kybarth. There is also a chemical plant in the town.

References

Notes

Sources

External links
Directory of organizations in Aprelevka 

Cities and towns in Moscow Oblast
Populated places established in 1899